Neoneuromus is a genus of dobsonfly endemic to the Indomalayan realm with 13 species. The larvae breed in montane streams. Adults are large with a forewing of 43 to 68 mm length and the body is yellow to red or brown with black marks on the head and pronotum. The wings are marked in dark patterning in the membrane and along the veins. They are closely related to Nevromus from which they are separated by the attenuation of the 9th sternum with an incised tip.

Species in the genus include:
 Neoneuromus indistinctus 
 Neoneuromus maculatus 
 Neoneuromus niger 
 Neoneuromus similis 
 Neoneuromus vanderweelei 
 Neoneuromus coomani 
 Neoneuromus orientalis 
 Neoneuromus tonkinensis 
 Neoneuromus fenestralis 
 Neoneuromus ignobilis 
 Neoneuromus latratus 
 Neoneuromus sikkimmensis 
 Neoneuromus maclachlani

References 

Megaloptera
Insect genera